Events in the year 1726 in Norway.

Incumbents
Monarch: Frederick IV

Events

Arts and literature

Births
 10 April - Lucia Pytter, philanthropist

Full date unknown
Hans Strøm, zoologist (died 1797)

Deaths